Zagaj pod Bočem is a settlement in the Municipality of Rogaška Slatina in eastern Slovenia. It lies at the southern foothills of Mount Boč. The wider area around Rogaška Slatina is part of the traditional region of Styria. It is now included in the Savinja Statistical Region.

Name
The name of the settlement was changed from Zagaj to Zagaj pod Bočem in 1953.

Cultural heritage
Evidence of a prehistoric settlement has been found near the village with earthworks and Hallstatt era pottery.

References

External links
Zagaj pod Bočem on Geopedia

Populated places in the Municipality of Rogaška Slatina